Mountain Park is a city primarily in the western part of  northern Fulton County in the U.S. state of Georgia, with a small portion extending less than  into southeastern Cherokee County. As of the 2020 census, the city had a total population of 583.

Incorporated in 1927, it is essentially an eclectic neighborhood, and is designated a wildlife refuge. There is no zoning for commercial or business uses, only residential.

Law enforcement is provided by the Roswell Police Department on a contract basis.

History

Mountain Park was incorporated in 1927. Mountain Park Volunteer Fire and Rescue was formed in 1977 and is an all-volunteer fire and EMS department providing emergency management services to the city. It also provides Automatic Aid to Roswell and mutual aid to the Fulton/Cherokee/Cobb County fire departments. It is state-certified and has roughly 20 members who are state or nationally certified for emergency services.  In mid-May 2008 a severe thunderstorm with high winds from a just-dissipated EF2 tornado blew through, damaging many homes, some structurally.  Severe flooding occurred in September, 2009 after a 13-inch per hour rain event.  Flash flooding caused significant damage to several dozen houses and municipal structures.  The Fire Department and Civic Building were significantly damaged and were reconstructed.

Geography
Mountain Park is located at  (34.082672, -84.413641).

Mountain Park is bordered on three sides by Roswell, and on the west by an unincorporated area of Cherokee County; although the city extends into Cherokee County, the large majority of the city is located in Fulton County.

Lake Garrett is within the city, and downstream to the northwest Lake Cherful straddles the county line. Both lakes are gradually being destroyed by siltation, caused by development upstream in Roswell. The city sued in 2005.  The developers contested their liability and claim the lakes have likely out-lived their "life expectancy", and the situation is likely caused by the natural flow of silt and sediment in the basin.  Due to numerous pre-trial motions, the case did not go to court until October 2010, when the jury ruled in favor of Mountain Park but only awarded $45,000 in damages.

Demographics

2020 census

As of the 2020 United States census, there were 583 people, 273 households, and 171 families residing in the city.

2000 census
As of the census of 2000, there were 506 people, 228 households, and 134 families residing in the city. The racial makeup of the city was 95.26% White, 1.58% Black or African American, 0.40% Native American, 0.40% Asian, 0.40% from other races, and 1.98% from two or more races. Hispanic or Latino of any race were 1.38% of the population.

There were 228 households, out of which 29.4% had children under the age of 18 living with them, 46.9% were married couples living together, 8.8% had a female householder with no husband present, and 40.8% were non-families. 29.8% of all households were made up of individuals, and 6.1% had someone living alone who was 65 years of age or older. The average household size was 2.22 and the average family size was 2.80.

In the city, the population was spread out, with 20.0% under the age of 18, 4.0% from 18 to 24, 33.0% from 25 to 44, 34.6% from 45 to 64, and 8.5% who were 65 years of age or older. The median age was 42 years. For every 100 females, there were 101.6 males. For every 100 females age 18 and over, there were 94.7 males.

The median income for a household in the city was $55,875, and the median income for a family was $61,875. Males had a median income of $42,500 versus $35,769 for females. The per capita income for the city was $31,085. About 2.6% of families and 3.8% of the population were below the poverty line, including 3.0% of those under age 18 and 4.2% of those age 65 or over.

References

External links

 City of Mountain Park official website

Cities in Georgia (U.S. state)
Cities in Fulton County, Georgia
Cities in Cherokee County, Georgia
Populated places established in 1927